The Dumont d'Urville Station is a French scientific station in Antarctica on Île des Pétrels, archipelago of Pointe-Géologie in Adélie Land. It is named after explorer Jules Dumont d'Urville, whose expedition landed on Débarquement Rock in the Dumoulin Islands at the northeast end of the archipelago on January 21, 1840. It is operated by the "French Polar Institute Paul-Émile Victor", a joint operation of French public and para-public agencies. It is the administrative centre of Adélie Land.

History

In 1952, a small base was built on Île des Pétrels to study a rookery of emperor penguins. This base was called Base Marret. As the main base Port Martin was a total loss, Base Marret was chosen as overwintering site for 1952/1953. The new main base, Dumont D'Urville station, was built on the same island and opened on January 12, 1956, to serve as the centre for French scientific research during the Antarctic International Geophysical Year 1957/1958. The station has remained in active use ever since.

The station allows 30-40 people to come ashore at one time.  Ice and strong katabatic winds often prevent landings, either by boat or by helicopter.  The station can accommodate about 30 winter-overs and 90 during the summer. The icebreaker ship L'Astrolabe carries supplies and personnel to the station from the port of Hobart, Tasmania. It does 5 round-trips between November and March.

The Academy Award-winning documentary film La Marche de l'empereur, released in English as March of the Penguins, was filmed in the region around this base.

Wildlife 
One of the main interests of the base is the study of wildlife, notably the emperor penguins. In the summer, the rocks near the base serve as a refuge for the Adélie penguin, which comes here to reproduce. Skua, snow petrel, giant petrel, Cape petrel also spend the summer near the base. In the winter, only emperor penguins stay to reproduce. However, around August, giant petrels return to feed on emperor penguin chicks.

Some marine animals are equally present despite the negative temperature of the water. Among rare visitors to the archipelago, there are other species of penguins, orcas, and rorquals.

Activity 
The base Dumont d'Urville is first and foremost a scientific base, even if nowadays the transportation of supplies to the Concordia Station (operated together with Italian researchers) represents an important part of the activity of the base. The French Southern and Atlantic Lands (TAAF) administration, the French Polar Institute Paul-Émile Victor (IPEV) and the French Navy jointly operate the icebreaker Astrolabe which is based out of Reunion. The vessel is used both to bring personnel and supplies to the Dumont d'Urville Station and for research and patrol duties.

Chemistry of the atmosphere 
The laboratory in atmospheric chemistry of the base is used to analyse, among other things, sulfur compounds present in the atmosphere.

Geophysics 
Nowadays, the study of geophysics is less present in the base. Nonetheless, several tools are still in use, notably  a tide gauge, a cosmic rays detector, a GPS to measure the dip of the Antarctica into the upper mantle, and a lidar, which allows the analysis of the ozone depletion and the ozone holes.

Logistics 
The proper functioning of the base and supplying Concordia requires significant logistics, especially in the summer. Technicians, including electricians, plumbers, mechanics for the electric plant and auto mechanics  are essential for the proper functioning of the base all year round.

Climate
Dumont d'Urville Station has an ice cap (EF) climate with conditions milder than inland.  This station experienced record warm temperatures and precipitation due to an unprecedented atmospheric river event in March 2022.

Gallery

See also
 List of Antarctic research stations
 List of Antarctic field camps
 List of airports in Antarctica
 Concordia Station

References

External links

  Official website IPEV Institut Polaire Français Paul Emilie Victor
  Terre Adélie - Dumont d'Urville Station, site of Samuel Blanc
  Base Dumont d'Urville site from Ifremer
  l'Astrolabe
 A winter at the station
 COMNAP Antarctic Facilities
 COMNAP Antarctic Facilities Map

Outposts of Adélie Land
Outposts of Antarctica
1956 establishments in Antarctica
Articles containing video clips